A Control and Reporting Centre (CRC) is according to the Joint Chiefs of Staff publication 1.02 defined as  – A subordinated air control element of the tactical air control centre for which radar control and warning operations are conducted within its area of responsibility.

Control and Reporting Posts (CRP) & Reporting Posts (RP), which provide radar control and surveillance within their defined areas of responsibility, may operate under the control of a CRC.

NATO operates ACC Systems in static or deployable CRC's in order to provide Airspace Surveillance, to control Air Force Operations and to meet national and allied military commitments. In NATO Europe a CRC might be subordinated to a Combined Air Operations Centre (CAOC) and / or to an equivalent national Air Operation Centre.

CRC in NATO Europe

External links 
 CAOC Uedem
 CAOC Torrejon
 DACCC Poggio Renatico

References 

MILITÄRISCHES STUDIENGLOSAR ENGLISCH Teil I, A – K, Bundessprachenamt (Stand Januar 2001), page 355, definition: control and reporting center [CRC].

Command and control
National air defence operations centres
NATO